The Laurel Fork is a tributary of the Clear Fork,  long, in southern West Virginia in the United States.

Downstream of Jesse, the stream is paralleled by West Virginia Route 10.

See also
List of rivers of West Virginia

References 

Rivers of West Virginia
Tributaries of the Guyandotte River
Rivers of Raleigh County, West Virginia
Rivers of Wyoming County, West Virginia
Allegheny Plateau